Senator Crockett may refer to:

Alexander G. Crockett (1862–1919), Virginia State Senate
John H. Crockett (1864–1925), Virginia State Senate
Pliny A. Crockett (1873–1958), Maine State Senate
Robert O. Crockett (1881–1955), Virginia State Senate
Samuel T. Crockett (1890–1946), Virginia State Senate